Willie Fitzmaurice (born 4 December 1946) was a hurler from Killeedy, south of Limerick, who played with the Limerick teams in the 1970s and 1980s

In 1998, he became a county team selector along with former teammates Éamonn Cregan and David Punch and advocated the retention of the back-door system.

He was the parish priest in Kilmallock in 2008;  as such he celebrated the mass of his deceased niece, Elizabeth Gubbins, who died in the controversial Vernelli hit-and-run case in Rome.

He is the brother of Limerick hurler Paudie Fitzmaurice.

Hurling style
The Fitzmaurice brothers were noted for their unusual hurling technique: when striking the sliotar, the Fitzmaurice brothers did not bend their elbows, making it difficult for their opponents to hook them.

References 

Living people
Limerick inter-county hurlers
Killeedy hurlers
Munster inter-provincial hurlers
20th-century Irish Roman Catholic priests
1946 births
21st-century Irish Roman Catholic priests
Alumni of St Patrick's College, Maynooth